The 1993 South Australian Soccer Federation season was the 87th season of soccer in South Australia.

1993 SASF Division One

The 1993 South Australian Division One season was the top level domestic association football competition in South Australia for 1993. It was contested by 10 teams in a 18 round league format, each team playing all of their opponents twice.

League table

Finals

1993 SASF Division Two

The 1993 South Australian Division Two season was the second level domestic association football competition in South Australia for 1993. It was contested by 8 teams in a 18 round league format, each team playing all of their opponents twice.

League table

Finals

References

1993 in Australian soccer
Football South Australia seasons